Kenneth Charles Brown (February 13, 1925 – June 24, 2016) was a Canadian diplomat.

Biography 
Born in Ann Arbor, Michigan, USA, he was the son of George Williams Brown and Vera Beatrice Kenny. He grew up in Toronto, Ontario, and attended the University of Toronto Schools. He graduated in Modern History and Modern Languages from Victoria College, University of Toronto in the class of 1945. In 1944, he joined the Canadian Army, serving in the Intelligence Corps in Northwestern Europe.

In 1946, he was awarded a Rhodes Scholarship (Canadian Forces Overseas) to study at Balliol College, Oxford. He read Philosophy, Politics and Economics, earning a Half-Blue in ice hockey and a BA (Oxon) in 1948. In the same year he joined the Canadian Foreign Service in the Department of External Affairs. In addition to headquarters assignments he had postings in the Canadian delegation to ECOSOC meetings in Geneva, Switzerland and to the United Nations General Assembly in Paris (both in 1948) and in the Canadian Embassies in Havana, Cuba (1951–1954), Berne, Switzerland (1957–1960) and Washington, D.C., USA (1963–1967). From 1970–73 he was Canadian Ambassador concurrently to Cuba and Haiti. At the time there was a Canadian diplomatic office in Port-au-Prince headed by a chargé d'affaires but the Ambassador was resident in Havana. From 1976–80 he was Ambassador to Sweden.

From 1980–83, he chaired the Refugee Status Advisory Committee, a non-statutory forerunner of the Immigration and Refugee Board of Canada. In 1983, following the passage of the first Canadian Access to Information Act, he established the Access to Information Office in the Department of External Affairs and served as the department's Access to Information Coordinator until 1986. He was then seconded to the Treasury Board Secretariat until his retirement in 1988 to prepare a manual for Access to Information Coordinators. He married Ruth Louise Johnston in 1948 and they have three sons and one daughter.

He died on 24 June 2016 at the age of 91.

References

External links 
 Foreign Affairs and International Trade Canada Complete List of Posts

1925 births
2016 deaths
Alumni of Balliol College, Oxford
Canadian Army personnel of World War II
University of Toronto alumni
Ambassadors of Canada to Haiti
Ambassadors of Canada to Sweden
Ambassadors of Canada to Cuba
People from Ann Arbor, Michigan
Canadian Intelligence Corps officers
Canadian Army officers